Indigo Bay Lodge Airport  is an airport serving the former Indigo Bay Lodge on Bazaruto Island, Mozambique. The current facility is the Anantara Bazaruto Island Resort. The private facility has an airstrip and a helipad.

See also
Transport in Mozambique

References

External links
World Airport Codes - Indigo Bay Lodge
  Great Circle Mapper - Indigo Bay Lodge

Airports in Mozambique